Basing can refer to:
Old Basing, a village in the English county of Hampshire
 Basing House, a Tudor palace and castle in Old Basing
Slicing (interface design), image slicing for web design and interface design
Seabasing